Gheorghe "Ghiţă" Licu (1 December 1945 – 8 April 2014) was a Romanian handball pivot player. Between 1966 and 1976 he capped 197 times for the national team and scored 328 goals, winning world titles in 1970 and 1974 and Olympic medals in 1972 and 1976. Domestically he played his entire career from 1964 to 1980 for Dinamo Bucuresti, winning the national titles in 1965, 1966 and 1978 and the Romanian Cup in 1979. After retiring from competitions Licu became a handball coach. In 1980–1993 he worked with Dinamo Bucuresti in Romania, and in 1995–2006 with SC Madgeburg in Germany, first with the junior and then with the senior team, leading them to the German national title in 2001 and the EHF Champions League victory in 2002. His son Robert also became an Olympic handball player and coach.

References

1945 births
2014 deaths
Romanian male handball players
CS Dinamo București (men's handball) players
Handball players at the 1972 Summer Olympics
Handball players at the 1976 Summer Olympics
Olympic handball players of Romania
Olympic silver medalists for Romania
Olympic bronze medalists for Romania
Olympic medalists in handball
Medalists at the 1976 Summer Olympics
Medalists at the 1972 Summer Olympics
Deaths from cancer in Romania